Charles W. Lynde (1790 in Brookfield, Worcester County, Massachusetts – 1860 in Brooklyn, Kings County, New York) was an American lawyer and politician from New York.

Life
He was the son of John Lynde (1745–1817) and Sarah (Warner) Lynde (1753–1829). He removed to Sherburne, Chenango County, New York, and was there in business with his brother Tilly Lynde for some time. He married Cynthia Thompson, a daughter of Judge Joel Thompson (1760–1843), and later they removed to Homer, Cortland County.

Lynde was Surrogate of Cortland County from 1828 to 1832.

He was an Anti-Masonic member of the New York State Senate (6th D.) from 1831 to 1834, sitting in the 54th, 55th, 56th and 57th New York State Legislatures.

In 1838, he removed to Brooklyn and practiced law there.

Congressman William Pitt Lynde (1817–1885) was his nephew.

Sources
The New York Civil List compiled by Franklin Benjamin Hough (pages 128ff, 143 and 413; Weed, Parsons and Co., 1858)
Charles Rollin Lynde, his son's obit in NYT on July 28, 1894
Sherburne Cennial Celebration transcribed at RootsWeb
Lynde genealogy at RootsWeb

1790 births
1860 deaths
People from Brookfield, Massachusetts
People from Sherburne, New York
People from Cortland County, New York
People from Brooklyn
New York (state) state senators
Anti-Masonic Party politicians from New York (state)
19th-century American politicians
New York (state) state court judges
19th-century American judges